NPR College Ground is a cricket ground of NPR Group of Institute situated at Dindigul, Tamil Nadu. It is an artificial turf ground with a seating capacity of 5000 and flood lights.

The ground has hosted 10 first class cricket matches and it is also a venue for Tamil Nadu Premier League tournament.

See also 

 Indian Cement Company Ground
 Salem Cricket Foundation Stadium

References

External links 
 NPR Colleges
 Cricbuzz
 Cricinfo

Cricket grounds in Tamil Nadu
Dindigul
Year of establishment missing